Lindy or Lindy's may refer to:

People
Lindy (name), a unisex given name and nickname

Lindy (singer) or Lindy Vopnfjörð, Canadian singer-songwriter
"Lucky Lindy" or "Lindy", nickname for U.S. aviator Charles Lindbergh (1902-1974)
"Lady Lindy", nickname for U.S. aviatrix Amelia Earhart (1897-1937)
Rick Lindy (born 1967), American actor and country/rockabilly musician

Places
Lindy Creek, Pennsylvania, United States
Lindy, Nebraska, United States, an unincorporated community
 Nickname for Lindenhurst, New York village

Companies
Lindy Electronics, a German manufacturer of computer and AV connectivity products
Lindy Legendary Fishing Tackle, an American producer of fishing tackle
Lindy's, a restaurant in New York City
Lindy’s Sports, an American sports magazine

Other uses
Lindy (opera), an opera by Moya Henderson

See also 

Lindy Hop, an American swing dance
Lindy effect, a theory of the useful life expectancy of ideas and technology
Mini Lindy, a line of small toy plastic model kits
Lucky Lindy (disambiguation)
Lindbergh (disambiguation)
Lindberg (disambiguation)
Lundy (disambiguation)